Blabia costaricensis is a species of beetle in the family Cerambycidae. It was described by Breuning in 1943. It is known from Costa Rica (from which its species epithet is derived), Honduras and Panama.

References

Blabia
Beetles described in 1943